Eumarrah (born about 1798 in the Midlands near Campbell Town - died 24 March 1832 in Launceston, Tasmania) was an Aboriginal Tasmanian leader. He was known by the names Kahnneher Largenner.

He had been part of the group who travelled with George Augustus Robinson on his Friendly Mission in the late 1820s.

A watercolour drawing of "Ehumarah" by Thomas Bock is in the collection of the British Museum.

References

1798 births
1832 deaths
Indigenous Tasmanian people